Nanganur is a village in siddipet district of Telangana, India.

Institutions
 Andhra Bank has a branch at Nanganur.
2 Govt Junior Colleges in Nangnoor.
Temples – there are 5 temples in Nangnoor Village:
 Nallapochamma Temple. It is located towards Ankushapur Road, Sunday and Thursday many devotees used to come to the temple.
SRI Rama temple 
Uru Pochamma
Hanuman Temple is located at Satyam House
Venkateshwer temple.
shiva temple
panchamuka anjaneya swamy temple bc, colony

Villages
The villages in Nanganur mandal includes: Akkanepalle, Ankushapur, Baddipadaga, Durgapalle, Gatlamalyal, Ghanpur, Katha, Khanapur, Konaipalle, Kondamrajpalle, Meqdumpur, Mundrai, Nagrajpalle, Nanganur, Narmetta, Oblapur, Palamakula, Rajgopalpet, Rampur, Siddannapet, 
Thimmaipalle, Velkatur, Venkatapur, etc..

References

Mandals in Medak district